Juan Mauricio Castillo Balcázar (born 29 October 1970) is a Chilean retired footballer who played as a forward during his career. He obtained six caps (one goal) for the Chilean national side, making his debut on 31 March 1993.

External links
 
 Juan Castillo at playmakerstats.com (English version of ceroacero.es)
 Juan Castillo at PartidosdelaRoja (in Spanish)

1970 births
Living people
People from La Serena
Chilean footballers
Chile international footballers
Association football forwards
1993 Copa América players
1997 Copa América players
Deportes La Serena footballers
San Luis de Quillota footballers
Unión Española footballers
Colo-Colo footballers
Deportes Temuco footballers
Deportes Iquique footballers
Coquimbo Unido footballers
Primera B de Chile players
Chilean Primera División players